Dušan Vemić (born 17 June 1976) is a Serbian tennis coach and former professional tennis player.

Professional career
His professional tennis career started in 1995, and his career high was No. 146 in singles (reached on 25 February 2008), and No.31 in doubles (on 12 January 2009). Vemić ranks 19th in Fastest recorded tennis serves (235 km/h / 146 mph) in Tour history.

Vemić began 2007 ranked #406, down 170 spots from the start of 2006. He had success in 2007 playing at all levels of the tennis tour: Futures, Challenger, and ATP events. Two Futures semifinals and a final, qualifying into 3 ATP events, and qualifying into and winning a match in a top-level Challenger moved his ranking back into the top-300 in mid-April. He then reached the semifinal of a top-level Challenger in Bermuda in April and qualified into the main draw of the French Open in May, where he lost in four sets to eventual third-rounder Janko Tipsarević. In August, a semifinal performance in a top-level Challenger in Segovia followed by a finals appearance the next week in a Challenger in Binghamton pushed his ranking back into the top-200 for the first time since he was there for two weeks in 2004, and was his highest ranking since May 1998, when he spent 5 weeks in the top-200.

In 2008, Vemić competed in World Team Tennis with the Kansas City Explorers entry, which narrowly lost the league championship to the New York Buzz.

Highlights of his 2008-year include winning 5 doubles titles on the ATP Challenger Tour: Miami, United States with Ilija Bozoljac (SRB); Sunrise, Florida, USA with Janko Tipsarević (SRB); Cremona, Italy with Eduardo Schwank (ARG); Waco, Texas, USA with Alex Bogomolov Jr. (USA); and Calabasas, California, USA with Ilija Bozoljac (SRB).

Vemić also reached both the semifinals of the French Open and the quarterfinals at the U.S. Open with partner Bruno Soares.

Always versatile in his partner choice, Dusan Vemić has partnered with players such as Jamie Murray, Ivo Karlović, Novak Djokovic, and Mischa Zverev in 2009.

In the 2010 Australian Open, Vemić and Ivo Karlović made the semifinals, losing to Daniel Nestor
and Nenad Zimonjić 6–4,6–4

Coaching career

Following his career on tour, Vemić briefly coached WTA player Andrea Petkovic, helping her and coach Petar Popović to reach an all-time WTA ranking high of #9.

Soon afterward, Vemić joined the world number one tennis team for Novak Djokovic. As part of the Djokovic team, Vemić coached alongside Djokovic's longtime coach Marián Vajda in US Open '11, '12; Australian Open  '12, '13; French Open  '12, '13; Wimbledon '12, '13. During that time, Djokovic won two grand slam titles at the Australian Open and one grand slam title at the US Open in Flushing Meadows, New York, as well as the 2012 ATP World Tour Finals in London. In 2016, Vemic coached Djokovic at the ATP Miami Open, where he won the Championship against Kei Nishikori 6–3, 6–3, and surpassed Roger Federer in career prize money earnings.

In January 2013, Vemić joined the coaching staff of the Serbian Davis Cup team, seeing it to the Davis Cup finals against Czech Republic. He remains a coach of the Serbian team, helping lead them through the 2016 Davis Cup World Group competition.

In August 2016, Vemić was the official coach for the Serbian men's tennis team, for team Serbia, at the Games of the XXXI Olympiad in Rio de Janeiro. The team consisted of world #1 Novak Djokovic, former #1 ATP doubles player Nenad Zimonjić and ATP top 30 player Viktor Troicki.

From August 2016 to 2017, Vemić was the head coach for the most successful doubles team of all time, Americans Mike and Bob Bryan, also known as the Bryan brothers.

He then worked with Brandon Nakashima from May 2020 to February 2022.

ATP career finals

Doubles: 2 (2 runner-ups)

ATP Challenger and ITF Futures finals

Singles: 12 (3–9)

Doubles: 37 (16–21)

Performance timelines

Singles

Doubles

Mixed doubles

Awards
1995
 Best Male Tennis Player in FR Yugoslavia
1997
 Best Male Tennis Player in FR Yugoslavia

References

External links
 
 
 
 Vemic World Ranking History

1976 births
Living people
Serbs of Croatia
Sportspeople from Zadar
Serbia and Montenegro male tennis players
Serbian male tennis players
Serbian tennis coaches
Tennis players from Belgrade
Yugoslav male tennis players
Tennis players at the 2000 Summer Olympics
Olympic tennis players of Yugoslavia
Novak Djokovic coaches